Dame Jacqueline Docherty, DBE is a British nursing administrator and medical professional, who was Chief Executive of West Middlesex University Hospital in February 2009 until its merger with Chelsea and Westminster Hospital NHS Foundation Trust, having previously served as Director of Nursing, Director of Operations and Deputy Chief Executive at King's College Hospital, London.

She was appointed Chief Executive Officer of London North West University Healthcsre NHS Trust in 2015, overseeing Northwick Park, St Marks, Central Middlesex and Ealing hospitals and a (dwindling) number of community services across Hillingdon, Harrow, Brent and Ealing.

She was appointed Deputy Director of Nursing at West Lothian NHS Trust prior to becoming a member of the Management Executive at the Department of Health, the Scottish Office for four years. Jacqueline's main areas of responsibility in the Scottish Office were in relation to Quality and Clinical Effectiveness and Audit. 

Dame Jacqueline is a trustee of the King's Fund and co-chair of the London Social Partnership Forum.

King's College
In 1996 Jacqueline Doherty joined King's College as Executive Director of Nursing. She was also employed as an independent consultant to the Mexican Department of Health to support their Evidence Based Medicine programme, 1997–2000. 

She joined King's College Hospital as executive director of nursing in 1996, assuming a similar role for operations in 2001, and has also been employed as an independent consultant to the Mexican department of health. In September 1999 Docherty was appointed as London Regional Champion to help support and implement the "Improving Working Lives" campaign. In 2001 she became the Director of Operations at King's.

Honours
Docherty was created a Dame Commander of the Order of the British Empire in recognition of her long career, during which she has nursed in Scotland, Bath and London and for her services to the NHS.

External links
King's College Hospital website
National Health Service/Swansea website
Royal College of Nursing website
Association of UK University Hospitals
Streatham Guardian news excerpt

References 

Living people
Nurses from London
British nursing administrators
Dames Commander of the Order of the British Empire
People from Bath, Somerset
Place of birth missing (living people)
Year of birth missing (living people)